Neumarkt im Hausruckkreis is a municipality in the district of Grieskirchen in the Austrian state of Upper Austria.

Geography
Neumarkt lies in the Hausruckviertel. It is the municipality with the smallest area in Austria.

References

Cities and towns in Grieskirchen District